STS-96 was a Space Shuttle mission to the International Space Station (ISS) flown by Space Shuttle  Discovery, and the first shuttle flight to dock at the International Space Station. The shuttle carried the Spacehab module in the payload, filled with cargo for station outfitting. STS-96 launched from Kennedy Space Center, Florida, on 27 May 1999 at 06:49:42 AM EDT and returned to Kennedy on 6 June 1999, 2:02:43 AM EDT.

Crew

Space walk
 Jernigan and Barry  – EVA 1
EVA 1 Start: 30 May 1999 – 02:56 UTC
EVA 1 End: 30 May 1999 – 10:51 UTC
Duration: 7 hours, 55 minutes

Mission highlights

STS-96 was a logistics and resupply mission for the International Space Station carrying the Spacehab Double Module (DM) 13th Spacehab overall (6th dual module use).

Space Shuttle Discovery carried to the ISS an Integrated Cargo Carrier (ICC) with parts for the Russian cargo crane STRELA, which was mounted to the exterior of the Russian station segment. Furthermore, the ICC carried the SPACEHAB Oceaneering Space System Box (SHOSS) and the "ORU Transfer Device" (OTD), a U.S. built crane.

Other payloads on STS-96 were the Student Tracked Atmospheric Research Satellite for Heuristic International Networking Equipment (STARSHINE), the Shuttle Vibration Forces Experiment (SVF) and the Orbiter Integrated Vehicle Health Monitoring – HEDS Technology Demonstration (IVHM HTD).

The STARSHINE satellite consists of an inert,  hollow sphere covered by 1,000 evenly distributed, flat, polished mirrors, each 1 inch in diameter. The payload consists of the STARSHINE satellite, integrated with the Pallet Ejection System (PES), then mounted inside a lidless carrier. The HH equipment consists of one HH Lightweight Avionics Plate (LAP), then mounted inside a lidless carrier. Additional HH equipment consists of one Hitchhiker Ejection System Electronics (HESE), one 5.0 cubic-foot (142 L) HH canister, and one Adapter Beam Assembly (ABA). The purpose of the mission was to train international student volunteer observers to visually track this optically reflective spacecraft during morning and evening twilight intervals for several months, calculate its orbit from shared observations, and derive atmospheric density from drag-induced changes in its orbit over time.

The Shuttle Vibration Forces (SVF) Experiment provided flight measurements of the vibratory forces acting between an aerospace payload and its mounting structure. The force transducers were incorporated into four custom brackets which replaced the existing brackets used to attach the 5 ft (1.5 m) standard canister to the side wall GAS adapter beam. The payload was activated automatically by the Orbiter Lift-off vibration and operated for approximately 100 seconds. STS-96 was the second flight of the SVF experiment.

The purpose of the Orbiter Integrated Vehicle Health Monitoring- HEDS Technology Demonstration (IVHM HTD) was to demonstrate competing modern, off-the-shelf sensing technologies in an operational environment to make informed design decisions for the eventual Orbiter upgrade IVHM. The objective of IVHM was to reduce planned ground processing, streamline problem troubleshooting (unplanned ground processing), enhance visibility into systems operation and improve overall vehicle safety.

A copy of Blizzard Entertainment's StarCraft real-time strategy game was also flown aboard STS-96. It resides at Blizzard's headquarters in Irvine, CA.

Wake-up calls 
NASA began a tradition of playing music to astronauts during the Gemini program, which was first used to wake up a flight crew during Apollo 15.
Each track is specially chosen, often by their families, and usually has a special meaning to an individual member of the crew, or is applicable to their daily activities.

See also

List of human spaceflights
List of International Space Station spacewalks
List of Space Shuttle missions
List of spacewalks and moonwalks 1965–1999
Outline of space science

Notes
a.

References

External links
 NASA mission summary 
 STS-96 Video Highlights 

Spacecraft launched in 1999
Space Shuttle missions
Spacecraft which reentered in 1999
May 1999 events
June 1999 events
1999 in Florida